Lennon Glacier is a glacier flowing southwest into the outer part of Lazarev Bay, in northern Alexander Island, Antarctica. It was surveyed by the British Antarctic Survey (BAS), 1975–76, and was named by the UK Antarctic Place-Names Committee in 1980 after BAS glaciologist Peter Wilfred Lennon, who worked on Alexander Island, 1974–76.

See also
 List of glaciers in the Antarctic
 Hampton Glacier
 Palestrina Glacier
 Sullivan Glacier

References

Glaciers of Alexander Island